Edgeborough School is a prep school near Farnham, Surrey in England. It is currently attended by ~360 kids between 2 and 13. The Head is Daniel Cox, former Deputy Head of Lambrook School, Ascot.

Overview
Edgeborough became co-educational in 1992 and celebrated its centenary in 2006. The Head is Daniel Cox, former Deputy Head of Lambrook School, Ascot. Its grounds measure ~50 acres, including parts of its. Frensham Place, a former country house

The school is divided into four departments: Nursery, Pre-Prep, Lower Prep and Upper Prep, age-appropriate in terms of staffing, curriculum and resources. French is available starting at age three. Latin is also taught to students at least nine years of age. ICT, music, drama, art, pottery and design technology are also taught at Edgeborough School.

The school offers extracurricular sporting activities including athletics, badminton, basketball, canoeing, a climbing wall, cricket, cross country, football, golf, gymnastics, hockey, lacrosse, martial arts, netball, rounders, rugby, swimming, table tennis, tennis and volleyball

Facilities
Buildings and grounds include a floodlit astroturf pitch, theatre, dance studio, chapel and an open-air swimming pool. In addition, there are several pitches and two cricket pavilions,an astro cricket strip  one of which has a mechanical score board. In the year 2000, the school underwent a building and rebuilding program, replacing its library and building its science labs. The Year-6-to-8 classroom block was renovated and a dance studio was built.

History
Edgeborough was established in 1906 in Guildford as a small, privately owned boarding school for boys. It moved to its present site in Frensham in 1939. It became a charitable trust in 1966, and co-education was introduced in 1992 when the Pre-Prep and Nursery departments were opened.

Frensham Place, which now houses the school's weekly boarders, was built about 1880. It is an imposing stone building with shaped gables which the school has not had listed. Two cottages by the walled garden area were designed by the architect Edwin Lutyens. Frensham Place was the former home of the Woodroffe family, and the house's chapel was the first place of worship for Catholics from Farnham since the Reformation. Local masses were celebrated by the Woodroffe's chaplain Father Gerin, who had come to Farnham in 1888 to escape persecution in France.

The building was also the former home of the newspaper proprietor and magnate Sir Cyril Arthur Pearson, the founder of the Daily Express. Pearson died at the house after hitting his head on the bath tap. The contents of the house, including all Pearson's furniture and pictures, were put up for sale in 1913.

Frensham Place was also the birthplace of Count Antoine Seilern, one of the most noted art collectors of the twentieth century. He was born at the house on 17 September 1901, the son of an Austrian nobleman Count Carl Seilern and his American wife Antoinette Woerishoffer.

Notable alumni

 Keith Douglas, poet
 Sir John Bertrand Gurdon, Nobel Prize Winner 2012. Developmental biologist.
 B. H. Liddell Hart, soldier, military historian and inter-war theorist
 Wilfred St Aubyn Malleson, recipient of the Victoria Cross at Gallipoli
 Murray Seasongood, politician and former mayor of Cincinnati, Ohio
 John Strachey, politician
 Bob Tisdall, Olympic gold medalist hurdler

References

External links
 Edgeborough School website

Preparatory schools in Surrey
Boarding schools in Surrey
Educational institutions established in 1906
1906 establishments in England

Farnham